Jagny-sous-Bois is a commune in the Val-d'Oise department and Île-de-France region of France.

Geography

Climate

Jagny-sous-Bois has a oceanic climate (Köppen climate classification Cfb).

Population

See also
Communes of the Val-d'Oise department

References

External links
Official website 

Association of Mayors of the Val d'Oise 

Communes of Val-d'Oise